Lee Bul (born in Yeongju, Gyeongsangbuk-do, South Korea in 1964) is a contemporary sculpture and installation artist who appeared on the art scene in the late 1980s. Her work questions patriarchal authority and the marginalization of women by revealing ideologies that permeate our cultural and political spheres.

These themes take form in cold, mechanical sculptures and installations that reflect the ideals of a futuristic society. She has focused on shaping oppression of women, commercialization of sex, etc. that are intensified in a male-dominated society through various performances and objects. Since her introduction to the world of art, she has caught the eyes of the world of art all around the world with various ambitious artworks. She has been described as the most famous artist in South Korea.

Lee Bul presented an innovative performance using her own body and a three-dimensional textile artwork. Also, in an invitational exhibition of MoMA (The Museum of Modern Art) in the United States, she brought even the sense of rotten smell in process of time to the exhibition by using raw fish.

In 1999, Lee was awarded an honorable mention at the 48th Venice Biennale for her contribution to both the Korean Pavilion and the international exhibition curated by Harald Szeemann.

Biography 
Lee was born January 25, 1964, in Yeongju, Gyeongsangbuk-do, South Korea.  Her parents were political dissidents and because of this her and her family were never able to stay in one place. Her parents would often be incarcerated which caused Lee to be the caretaker of her siblings. Because of the actions of her parents and the crime of guilt-by-association, Lee was unable to attend social activities or gatherings of more than 10 people. This pushed her to find an activity that she could do on her own. She decided that to survive the oppressive censorship of ideology that artistic expression was her only way out. Lee credits her experience growing up as the force behind her life and work. She studied sculpture at Hongik University in Seoul, graduating in 1987. Though she finished school, while there Lee realized it was still conforming to the system and she sought out other outlets to express herself. She tried music and theater before discovering her love for performance art.

Lee currently lives and primarily works in Seoul, South Korea.

Work 
Most of Lee's artworks are installation pieces that involve the audience or herself being placed into the work. Her work appears to refer to some of the brutality of the Korean government up through 1987, with reference to torture. Lee pulls inspiration for her work from a variety of sources including film, literature, architecture, and the political and cultural history of Europe and South Korea. In an interview with Lee Bul by Soraya Murray, Bul mentions that despite her upbringing in a very political family, Lee has never personally identified with South Korea’s late-coming feminist movement. “I don’t believe in any ‘isms’ ” she says. But she is an artist who constantly questions political ideals. A lot appears to comment on the ideals surrounding women’s bodies and the desire for bodily improvement. For Lee's Live Forever (2001), there is conflict between human and nature, encapsulated in the struggle for immortality through technology is elaborated upon with. In this multi- media installation, three white pods that resemble futuristic auto designs are arranged in the exhibition space,The appearance of the work is like a streamlined concept car, very futuristic. Unlike any of Bul's previous works, this work is fluid and is a rare piece of art accessible to the audience. Viewers can see the occupants through the glass. In the Live Forever capsule, sound can't be heard because Lee Bul uses acoustic foam to silence the noise. Futuristic and clean, these objects are beyond the abjection of Bul's monsters or her amputee female cyborgs. Nevertheless they remain ambivalent objects, compositing controlled, phallic external profiles with richly upholstered interiors that suggest prenatal chambers.

Soraya Murray in the article “Cybernated Aesthetics: Lee Bul and the Body Transfigured” mentions " Live Forever resonates with the same intensity as the artist's former explorations of technology and the body. In their visual control and denial of uncontrollability, the karaoke pods powerfully address embodiment through their almost hysterical, technological containment of the Aesh. Simultaneously, this project continues Lee's engagement with women's bodies, particularly female sexuality as a modernist trope for the seductive and annihilative power of modern technology. In 1989, her performance "Abortion," was Lee Bul's first performance art in which she is naked in front of an audience, tied by a rope and hanging upside down from the ceiling, head to the ground, looking in agony. This position is like an infant emerging from the womb, which is materializing the difficulty of obtaining an abortion. She was considered at the forefront of avant-garde art in the metropolises of Tokyo and Seoul. Bul's work consistently breaches psychological, social, and political taboos while providing provocative homages to fear, pathos, beauty, and humor. As one of the only contemporary. Bul raised issues of “art vs craft” and of the laboring class through her embroidery works with sequins and beads and sublimated female crafts as art. Such crafts were an unrecognized means of livelihood for restless working-class women with children and housework to attend to. Sorry for suffering – You think I’m a puppy on a picnic 1990 is inspired from where Bul walked the streets of Tokyo dressed in one of her soft sculptures, interacting with a few passersby. Installed throughout the exhibition hall are two timelines explaining the political landscape that shaped much of Lee’s practice, the timelines appropriately address the marginalization of women in South Korea from 1960 – 2000 and historical guidance of the North and South Korean division. This is believed to be a feminist critique on the controlling of women’s bodies in patriarchal East Asian society, given Bul had transformed her female body into something monstrous; something socially unacceptable. Bul wanted to wear the outfit on a flight, but airport staff said she was too fat and bulky, so she was not allowed to fly. After some debate it was finally agreed that Bul could board the plane, provided she bought two seats. How better to show the restrictions placed on our bodies, than by donning a monster suit, and defying the (airline) rules?

I Need You (Monument) 
From 1996 and 1999, Lee completed three mixed media installations that incorporate photographs of the artist with large scale inflatable forms. One of these installations, entitled I Need You (Monument) (1996), features a swelling, phallic object with a photograph of an orientalize and lingerie-clad Lee on the front. Beneath the mass lies an array of pedals for viewers to further aerate the object. Notable is Lee's juxtaposition of title and medium, which contrasts the vulnerability of inflatables with hegemonic ideas of what a monument is made of. Furthermore, her use of pedals draws attention to society's contribution to traditional ideals.

Cyborg sculptures 
Lee's series of cyborg sculptures created in 1997–2011 became well known. The series started with Cyborg Red and Cyborg Blue in 1997–98. These works, as well as those that appear later in the series, feature decapitated anthropomorphic forms that are often missing an arm, leg, or both. Although the bodies read as female due to their hourglass shape, the idea of a cyborg transcends distinctions such as gender, race, and class.  The cords attached to the figures appear to signify recovery and rebuilding.  Rather than damage done intentionally to the piece such as Egyptian Sphinx, these sculptures convey the message that figures can be created the way they would like to be regardless of gender or background. According to the Guggenheim museum, which owns and displays two of Lee's sculptures, "Embodied in these uncanny human surrogates are the desires and anxieties surrounding genetic engineering, cloning, and cosmetic surgery, concerns that arise from the increasing conflation of the body and technology." The artist has stated that the cyborg is a trope for "our fear and fascination with the uncategorizable, the uncanny." In her “Cyborg W1-W4” and “Anagram” series (late 1990s) are a culmination of the artist’s interest in the human desire for reinvention and improvement, an obsession pursued most conspicuously by Western and Asian women through cosmetic surgery. With a combination of mechanical joints and feminine curves, details of the large breasts, and W4's miniskirt dress. Are alluding to the changes that women in Japan and South Korea made to suit man. This is a jab at male gaze.

Majestic Splendor 
Having been installed in a number of galleries around the world, Lee created her first rendition of Majestic Splendor in 1991 and has displayed it in exhibits several times since then. Majestic Splendor features several real dead fish that are decorated with sequins, beads, and other small flashy items. They are placed in plastic bags and pinned to the wall of the gallery in a grid pattern. Since they are real fish then over the course of the exhibition they begin to smell. In 1997, during the Projects showing at the Museum of Modern Art in New York, the exhibit had to be removed because the smell got so powerful that guards at the museum were becoming physically ill. After this Lee began using potassium permanganate, which is combustible, to help neutralize the smell.

In 2018 Majestic Splendor was intended to be on display at the Hayword Gallery in London as part of Lee Bul: Crashing, however, after being made aware of the potential dangers of potassium permanganate it was decided that the work would not be suitable to have on public display. While it was being removed from the premises the potassium permanganate activated and started a small fire, delaying the opening of the exhibition.

Exhibitions 
Lee Bul has had solo exhibitions worldwide including Live Forever which toured the New Museum of Contemporary Art in New York and The Power Plant in Toronto. She was selected as a finalist for the 1998 Hugo Boss Prize by the Guggenheim Museum, New York.

Other museums that have presented exhibitions of her work include Fondation Cartier, Paris; Domus Artium, Salamanca; Museum of Contemporary Art, Sydney; Japan Foundation, Tokyo; MAC, Musée d'Art Contemporain, Marseille; Le Consortium; Fabric Workshop and Museum, Philadelphia; Kunsthalle Bern, Switzerland; and the Museum of Modern Art, New York.

In March 2010, the Hara Museum ARC unveiled a permanent installation by Lee Bul entitled A Fragmentary Anatomy of Every Setting Sun. In February 2012, Tokyo's Mori Art Museum mounted a mid-career survey exhibition, the artist's largest exhibition to date.

In this video "Artist Lee Bul reveals her thinking and inspiration behind her site-specific installation at the Turbine Hall of the Industrial Precinct on Cockatoo Island, titled ‘Willing To Be Vulnerable’ (2015–16) for the Embassy of the Real."  Biennale of Sydney, "Artist interview with Lee Bul about Willing To Be Vulnerable," in Smarthistory, September 10, 2021, accessed December 1, 2021, https://smarthistory.org/artist-interview-with-lee-bul-about-willing-to-be-vulnerable/.

The Southbank Centres newly reopened Hayward Gallery hosted a survey of Lee's artists work beginning at the end of May 2018, her first in London; which explores the artist’s extensive investigation into the body and its relationship to architectural space. Occupying the entire gallery, this exhibition includes documentation of early performances, sculptural works from the iconic Monster, Cyborg and Anagram series and recent immersive installations, as well as a selection of the artist’s studio drawings.

In November 2020, an exhibition of the artist's work opened at St. Petersburg's Manege Central Exhibition Hall, 'marking a first-time encounter between Lee Bul's works and those by artists of the Russian avant-garde that influenced them.'

Solo exhibitions 

*denotes a two-person show

Recognition and awards

References

External links 
Lee Bul studio

20th-century sculptors
21st-century sculptors
Installation artists
1964 births
Living people
People from Yeongju
Hongik University alumni
South Korean contemporary artists
South Korean women artists
20th-century women artists
21st-century women artists
20th-century South Korean artists
21st-century South Korean artists
Recipients of the Ho-Am Prize in the Arts